George Arthur Smith (born 15 February 1890) was an English football player and manager.

Career
Born in London, Smith played for Ilford, before moving to Italian side Genoa in 1912. He was player-manager of Alessandria between 1913 and 1915.

References

1890 births
Year of death missing
Footballers from Greater London
English footballers
English football managers
English expatriate footballers
English expatriate football managers
Ilford F.C. players
Genoa C.F.C. players
U.S. Alessandria Calcio 1912 players
U.S. Alessandria Calcio 1912 managers
Association footballers not categorized by position
English expatriate sportspeople in Italy
Expatriate footballers in Italy
Expatriate football managers in Italy